The 2013–14 Santa Clara Broncos men's basketball team represented Santa Clara University during the 2013–14 NCAA Division I men's basketball season. It was head coach Kerry Keating's seventh season at Santa Clara. The Broncos played their home games at the Leavey Center and were members of the West Coast Conference. They finished the season 14–19, 6–12 in WCC play to finish in a tie for eighth place. They advanced to the quarterfinals of the WCC tournament where they lost to Gonzaga.

Before the season

Departures

Recruiting
Five players joined Santa Clara for the 2013-14 season. Of the five, four are freshman while one transferred from Fresno State. Three of the players joined in the winter while two joined after the spring season.

Roster

Schedule and results

|-
!colspan=9 style="background:#F0E8C4; color:#AA003D;"| Exhibition

|-
!colspan=9 style="background:#AA003D; color:#F0E8C4;"| Regular season

|-
!colspan=9 style="background:#F0E8C4; color:#AA003D;"| 2014 West Coast tournament

Game summaries

Exhibition: San Diego Christian

Bethesda
Series History: First Meeting

San Jose State
Series History: Santa Clara leads 74-29

Cal State Fullerton
Series History: Santa Clara leads 1-0

Notre Dame
Series History: Notre Dame leads 1-0
Announcers: Mike Couzens and Darrin Horn

Cable Car Classic: North Dakota State
Series History: First Meeting

Cable Car Classic: Rice
Series History: Series even 1-1

Cal State Bakersfield
Series History: Santa Clara leads 3-0

Cal Poly
Series History: Santa Clara leads 4-1

La Sierra
Series History: First Meeting

Las Vegas Classic: Radford
Series History: First Meeting

Las Vegas Classic: Sacred Heart
Series History: First Meeting

Las Vegas Classic: UNLV
Series History: UNLV leads 9-7

Las Vegas Classic: South Florida
Broadcasters: Brent Stover, Steve Lappas, and Doug Gottlieb

Gonzaga
Series History: Gonzaga leads series 49-30
Broadcasters: Roxy Bernstein and Miles Simon

Portland
Series History: Santa Clara leads 57-30
Broadcasters: Roxy Bernstein and Kris Johnson

Pepperdine
Series History: Santa Clara leads 76-50
Broadcasters: Rich Cellini, John Stege, and Amanda Blackwell

Loyola Marymount
Series History: Santa Clara leads 83-57
Broadcasters: Glen Kuiper and Dan Belluomini

Saint Mary's
Series History: Santa Clara leads 136-82
Broadcasters: Barry Tompkins and Dan Belluomini

Pacific
Series History: Santa Clara leads 89-41
Broadcasters: Barry Tompkins and Jarron Collins

San Diego
Series History: Santa Clara leads 41-33

BYU
Broadcasters: Glen Kuiper and Dan Belluomini
Series History: BYU leads 19-5

References

Santa Clara Broncos men's basketball seasons
Santa Clara